Washtucna (YTB-826) was a United States Navy  named for Chief Washtucna of the Palus tribe.

Construction

The contract for Washtucna was awarded 9 August 1971. She was laid down on 1 May 1973 at Marinette, Wisconsin, by Marinette Marine and launched 9 October 1973.

Operational history

Placed in service at San Diego, California, Washtucna performed local and coastal towing tasks for the 11th Naval District.

Stricken from the Navy List 21 August 1997, ex-Washtucna was transferred to the Department of the Interior at Midway Island 17 October 1997.  Converted to twin z-drive, she was reacquired by the navy and reinstated on 7 October 2008. Ex-Washtucna was simultaneously reclassified and redesignated as unnamed yard tug YT-801.

Currently in active service at Bangor, Washington as Z-826.

References

External links
 

Natick-class large harbor tugs
Ships built by Marinette Marine
1973 ships